Giorgio Venturi (born 23 June 1966) is a former Italian shot putter who competed at the 1996 Summer Olympics.

Biography 
He participated at the competition which was one of the best team results of the Italian national athletics team in the shot put events at the International competitions. This happened at the 1996 European Athletics Indoor Championships held in Stockholm, when three athletes participated in the competition, one won the race (Dal Soglio) and one ranked fourth (Fantini). Venturi was 14th but could not reach the final for only 15 centimeters.

National titles
Italian Athletics Indoor Championships
Shot put: 1989

References

External links
 

1966 births
Living people
Athletes (track and field) at the 1996 Summer Olympics
Italian male shot putters
Olympic athletes of Italy
Athletics competitors of Fiamme Azzurre